Nate Kenyon is an American author of thrillers, science fiction, and horror novels and short fiction. His latest book, Day One, was released by Thomas Dunne Books on October 1, 2013. Day One is about sentient machines taking over New York City.

Kenyon's first novel, Bloodstone (Five Star Publishing, 2006; Leisure Books, 2008), was a Bram Stoker Award Finalist and was voted the Preditors and Editors Horror Novel of the Year for 2006. His second novel, The Reach, was also a Bram Stoker Award Finalist. The Reach received a starred Publishers Weekly review, and was optioned for film. Kenyon's other novels include The Bone Factory (Leisure Books, July 2009) and Sparrow Rock (Leisure Books, May 2010). He has also written a science fiction novella, Prime (Apex Books, July 2009).

Kenyon has written two novels for Blizzard Entertainment and Pocket Books based on Blizzard's video game franchises, StarCraft and Diablo. StarCraft Ghost: Spectres was released in November 2010. Spectres is the sequel to the novel StarCraft Ghost: Nova, written by Keith R. A. DeCandido. Diablo: The Order was released in May 2012.

Kenyon is a member of the Horror Writers Association and International Thriller Writers.

Kenyon finished the Diablo III novel, Storm of Light, in late 2013.

References

External links
 http://natekenyon.com

Living people
21st-century American novelists
American horror writers
American male novelists
American science fiction writers
American male short story writers
21st-century American short story writers
21st-century American male writers
Year of birth missing (living people)